Grand Princess Seongmok or known before as Princess Seongmok was a Goryeo Royal family member as the daughter of King Taejo's 13th son, Wang Uk.

It was said that she would often go to the Hyeonhwa Temple (현화사) to pray for her parents along with her half younger brother, Wang Sun. From this, Seongmok became the first Korean noblewoman who held the title of Janggongju (장공주, 長公主; "Grand Princess") which later used by Yuan consorts in Goryeo (Yilianzhenbala and Jintong).

Although her detailed information was not recorded in Goryeosa, but during the Japanese Colonialism at Korea in 1930, her existence was made known through the Hyeonhwa Sabi (현화사비; builted in 1018 (10th year reign of King Hyeonjong)) which became the North Korean National Treasure Cultural Relic No. 151 and was discovered at Yeongchu Mountain, Pangyo-ri, Gaeseong-gun, Gyeonggi-do.

References

Year of birth unknown
Date of birth unknown
Place of birth unknown
10th-century Korean people
Year of death unknown
Date of death unknown
Place of death unknown
Goryeo princesses